The Diamond in the Fish is a studio album by the American eclectic rock band Havalina Rail Co., released 1996.

In his KPSU radio interview with Dave Cusik, Matt Wignall described the album: "We were experimenting with idea of like playing jazz, which incidentally, we kinda sucked at. And found out why most of the time all good jazz players are over fifty, 'cause it takes that long to get good at it."

Track listing
 "The Theme from the Diamond and the Fish" (1:07)
 "If I Did Not Love You" (4:28)
 "Ballad of a Spy" (5:13)
 "Paper Moon" (5:07)
 "Dominiques Library" (4:31)
 "Ron" (7:40)
 "No Brainer" (3:43)
 "Emmanuel" (3:22)
 "Prelude and Blues" (9:16)
 "Hot Pants" (2:29)
 "Banditos" (4:34)
 "The Diamond in the Fish" (3:35)

Personnel

Havalina Rail Co. lineup
Matt Wignall: Guitar, primary vocalist
Nathan Jenson: Saxophone, lead vocals on "Paper Moon" and "Prelude and Blues"
Orlando Greenhill: Double bass, bass guitar
Jeff T. Suri: Drums, vocals
Mark Cole: Percussion
Lori Ann Hoopes: Washboard, vocals

Guest musicians
Sierra Heart: Vocals
Brian Wallace: Saw on "Ron".

Notes
An alternate version of "Dominique's Library" appeared on the Tooth And Nail Records sampler Art Core Vol. 1.

The songs "Banditos" and "The Diamond in the Fish" were later rerecorded for the retrospective We Remember Anarchy.

1996 albums
Havalina albums